Francis Xavier Morgan, C. O. (born Francisco Javier Morgan Osborne, 18 January 1857 – 11 June 1935) was a Catholic priest of the Oratory of Saint Philip Neri, who had Spanish and British dual citizenship. He served for most of his priesthood at the Birmingham Oratory in Edgbaston. Decades after his death, Morgan has become famous as the teacher, legal guardian, and father figure to the fantasy author J. R. R. Tolkien.

Early years 
Francisco Javier Morgan Osborne was the son of Francis Morgan, a Welsh merchant who had settled at El Puerto de Santa María in Andalusia as a winemaker and exporter of sherry. There Francis Morgan had married a Spanish woman named María Manuela Osborne y Böhl de Faber (daughter of fellow British expatriate, Thomas Osborne Mann, founder of the wine business . Through his maternal grandmother, Aurora Böhl de Faber, the future priest was the grandnephew of historical novelist Cecilia Böhl de Faber, whose immortal contributions to Spanish literature were concealed behind the male pseudonym "Fernán Caballero" and drew both wide praise and comparisons with the novels of Sir Walter Scott.

According to a 1987 lecture about Fr. Morgan's life by a fellow priest of the Birmingham Oratory, Francis Morgan was a Protestant and María Manuela Osborne was a Catholic, which made theirs a disparity of cult marriage.

As a boy, Francis was sent to England, where he became only the third student to enter the primary school attached to the Birmingham Oratory, where his teachers included Father John Henry Newman. After primary school, Francis Morgan went to the Catholic grammar school run by Monsignor Thomas John Capel in London, and then entered the University of Louvain. After two years there he returned to the Birmingham Oratory as a novice.

In 1880 he accompanied Father John Norris, the prefect of the Birmingham Oratory, to Rome, where they were granted an audience with Pope Leo XIII. On his return, they both accompanied the newly appointed Cardinal Newman during his stay at the London residence of the Duke of Norfolk, a descendant of Recusants and the foremost Catholic in the English nobility, where polite society paid tribute to the Cardinal. After his ordination to the priesthood in 1883, Fr. Francis Morgan became an active member of the Birmingham Oratory community.

According to Fr. Philip Lynch of the Birmingham Oratory, "Fr. Francis was very interested in the Choir, and when the boy sopranos were in good voice he would describe their singing as drops of liquid gold. He would give Fr. Robert a cheque towards the Choir, expressed with certain criticisms and suggestions, which would not be adverted to. Fr. Francis had a pleasing tenor voice and did the Synagoga in all the sung Latin Passions in Holy Week for many years. When not on a public Mass, he always celebrated at Our Lady’s Altar. His room was the middle one on the front corridor, which he called his cell, but was too crowded to move easily round, including a moving bookcase in the centre. I personally had a fellow-feeling for him as a non-academic, whose sermons and doubts were undistinguished."

Relationship with the Tolkiens 

Although he initially taught at the Oratory school, he spent most of his life doing pastoral work in the parish run by the Oratorians. It was there that he met a widow who had recently converted to Catholicism and who came to the Oratory for spiritual comfort: Mabel Tolkien (née Suffield), along with her children Ronald and Hilary. By September 1900 Mabel had managed to enrol Ronald at the prestigious King Edward's School in Birmingham, and on Sundays the family attended Mass at the Oratory. 

In a 1965 letter to his son Michael, Tolkien recalled the influence of the man whom he always called "Father Francis": "He was an upper-class Welsh-Spaniard Tory, and seemed to some just a pottering old gossip. He was—and he was not. I first learned charity and forgiveness from him; and in the light of it pierced even the 'liberal' darkness out of which I came, knowing more about 'Bloody Mary' than the Mother of Jesus—who was never mentioned except as an object of wicked worship by the Romanists."

The Tolkiens had been living in a rather unstable situation since the death of the head of the family, Arthur Tolkien, who had worked in the Orange Free State as a branch manager of the Bank of Africa Limited. When their financial difficulties made it impossible for her to continue paying for Ronald's tuition at King Edward's School, Father Francis took him into the school run by the oratorians. Consequently, Mabel and her children moved close to the Oratory, to Oliver Road, and there the young boy remained in school until September 1903, when he won a scholarship to return to King Edward's School.

In April 1904 Mabel Tolkien fell seriously ill with diabetes, having great difficulty fending for herself. Father Francis arranged for her to rent two rooms in a cottage in Rednal, to the south of Birmingham, near the estate where the Oratorians had their cemetery and a retreat house. There Mabel would have the landlady's help with the housework; the landlady would also provide food, and the children could enjoy the countryside setting of the Lickey Hills. Rednal seems to have inspired Ronald's imaginary Rivendell.

In November 1904, seven months after being diagnosed with diabetes, Mabel Tolkien died at Rednal cottage in the care of Father Francis. In her will she appointed him legal guardian of her two children. The financial means the late Mrs. Tolkien left for the upbringing of the children were rather meagre, but Father Francis was to supplement them with money from his share of his family's sherry business in El Puerto de Santa Maria.

Father Francis took the Tolkien brothers to live with him at the Oratory. The library that the priest kept in his cell was frequently used by Ronald, who learned some Castilian Spanish from his guardian, which enabled him to create a language he called "naffarin". In all probability, thanks to Father Francis' library the young Tolkien had access to the Castilian historical novels of Cecilia Böhl de Faber, the priest's great-aunt. This has been suggested because of the similarity between Gollum's second riddle in The Hobbit concerning the wind, and the 187th riddle.

Soon after taking them in, Father Francis allowed Roland and Hilary to live with a sister-in-law of their late mother, Beatrice Suffield. After three years, the priest realised that Mrs Suffield, widowed and deeply depressed, could not offer the most suitable environment for the Tolkien brothers to grow up in. He looked for something more like a home for them, and so he decided to put them up in Mrs Faulkner's boarding house, right next door to the Oratory. Ronald, aged 16, met Edith Bratt, aged 19, who had been living alone with Mrs Faulkner since the death of their mother, and a romantic relationship began between the two teenagers.

Possibly given the disparity of cult marriage between his own parents, Father Francis Morgan considered it "altogether unfortunate" that his surrogate son was romantically involved with an older, Protestant woman. Tolkien later wrote that "the combined tensions" of having a serious romantic relationship in his teens nearly caused, "a very bad breakdown" and are the reason why he "muffed [his] exams" to enter Oxford University. Fr. Morgan accordingly prohibited him from meeting, talking to, or even corresponding with Edith until he was 21. Tolkien obeyed this prohibition to the letter, with one notable early exception, over which Father Morgan threatened to cut short his university career if he did not stop.

Father Francis again found new lodgings for the two boys, this time with the McSherry family, parishioners of the Oratory.

From there, Ronald successfully retook his exams to enter Oxford University, after which he moved to Oxford, but later returned and married Edith.

Death and legacy
Francis Xavier Morgan died in his room at the Birmingham Oratory at the age of 76 in 1935. He left each of the Tolkien brothers £1,000 as an inheritance. According to Fr. Philip Lynch, "The Oratory was a duller place without him." 

In a 1972 letter to his son Michael Tolkien, J. R. R. Tolkien wrote, "I remember after the death of Fr. Francis my 'second father'... saying to C.S. Lewis: 'I feel like a lost survivor into a new alien world after the real world has passed away.'"

In popular culture
 Father Francis Morgan was portrayed onscreen by Irish actor Colm Meaney in the 2019 biopic Tolkien.

Notes

References

Sources

External links
 F. Francis Xavier Morgan A reminiscence during a 16 November 1987 chapter address by F. Philip Lynch of the Birmingham Oratory.

1857 births
1935 deaths
19th-century English clergy
19th-century English Roman Catholic priests
Catholic University of Leuven (1834–1968) alumni
Clergy from Birmingham, West Midlands
J. R. R. Tolkien
Oratorians
People from El Puerto de Santa María
Spanish emigrants to the United Kingdom
Spanish people of German descent
Spanish people of Welsh descent